The 1998 Coca-Cola 600, the 39th running of the event, was a NASCAR Winston Cup Series race held on May 24, 1998 at Charlotte Motor Speedway in Charlotte, North Carolina. Contested at 400 laps on the 1.5 mile (2.4 km) speedway, it was the 11th race of the 1998 NASCAR Winston Cup Series season. Jeff Gordon of Hendrick Motorsports won the race.

Elliott Sadler made his NASCAR Winston Cup Series debut in this event.

Jeff Gordon managed to take over the championship lead from Jeremy Mayfield after the event was resolved.

Background
Charlotte Motor Speedway is a motorsports complex located in Concord, North Carolina, United States. It is 13 miles away from Charlotte, North Carolina. The complex features a 1.5 miles (2.4 km) quad oval track that hosts NASCAR racing such as the prestigious Coca-Cola 600 on Memorial Day weekend, The Winston, and the UAW-GM Quality 500. The speedway was built in 1959 by Bruton Smith and is considered the home track for NASCAR with many race teams located in the Charlotte area. The track is owned and operated by Speedway Motorsports Inc. (SMI).

Top 10 results

Race statistics
 Time of race: 4:23:53
 Average Speed: 
 Pole Speed: 182.976
 Cautions: 8 for 49 laps
 Margin of Victory: 0.41 sec
 Lead changes: 33
 Percent of race run under caution: 12.2%         
 Average green flag run: 39 laps

References

Coca-Cola 600
Coca-Cola 600
NASCAR races at Charlotte Motor Speedway